The Greenbushes lithium mine is an open-pit mining operation which is in Western Australia and is the world's largest hard-rock lithium mine. It is located to the south of the town of Greenbushes, Western Australia.

The mine is owned and operated by Talison Lithium which as of 2014 became a joint venture partnership between the Tianqi Lithium Corporation and the Albemarle Corporation. At the mine's current size, it can fulfil a third of the worldwide demand for lithium spodumene concentrate, which is used to produce lithium hydroxide, a component of lithium-ion batteries.

Global demand for lithium is expected to grow at a rate of 33.3% annually, and as such the mine is undergoing expansion along with the construction of the two nearby lithium processing facilities. The Kemerton facility is owned by Albemarle Corporation and the Kwinana facility is owned by Tianqi. Lithium industry revenue has increased at an annual rate of 8.6% from 2019–20, to a total of $2.7 billion.

Operations 

The Greenbushes mine is the world's largest hard rock lithium mine in terms of reserves, resources, production, and capacity. The facility's operations are made up of the mine and two nearby processing facilities that convert the raw lithium spodumene concentrate into lithium hydroxide before being sold to many of the world's leading battery manufacturers including LG Chem, CATL and Northvolt.

The twin processing facilities nearby (Albemarle's Kemerton plant and Tianqi's Kwinana plant, located in nearby Kemerton and Kwinana, respectively) are currently under construction. Kwinana will be Australia's first lithium recycling plant. It is reported that the profitability of the processing plant located near the mine is significant. 

In the past, brine mining for lithium has been far more cost effective and easier than hard-rock lithium mining. However, preliminary calculations show that the Greenbushes mine may be the first hard-rock lithium mine to show that hard-rock mining can be as cost effective and profitable as brine mining given the strategic benefits of having the processing next to extraction site. 

The Kemerton facility is still undergoing preliminary construction, while the Kwinana facility is undergoing final stage of commissioning for the first part of its operation. The Kwinana facility is the world's first fully automated battery-grade lithium hydroxide manufacturing facility outside of mainland China and can operate 24/7. The facility is also the world's first hard-rock sourced lithium chemical manufacturing facility outside of China, the largest of its kind, and is expected to have the lowest cash cost of any lithium processing plant globally.

The Kwinana facility is estimated to provide 200 permanent, full-time local jobs for the Kwinana community when it begins full-time operations. As of 2018, Talison was operating the Greenbushes mine at only 60% of its total capacity, and it is estimated that if the facility were operated at 100% capacity it could fulfil total global lithium demand by itself.

Greenbushes lithium deposit 

The Greenbushes deposit is renowned for containing the highest-grade quality lithium spodumene in the world. A nearby deposit (the Kapanga deposit) has recently been discovered and has received Joint Ore Reserves Committee resource recognition, saying that “Greenbushes pegmatite is a giant pegmatite dike of Archean age with substantial Li-Sn-Ta mineralization, including half the world’s tantalum resource.” The mine is estimated to have resources of  LCE and reserves of  LCE. The mine produces the highest product quality and sets the benchmark for chemical-grade specifications of minimum 6.0%  and maximum 0.8% .

Ownership 

The mine was bought by Tianqi Lithium Corporation in 2013. However, Tianqi soon came into financial difficulties and was forced to offload the minority stake in the mine to the competing bidder, the American-based Albemarle Corporation in 2014. The 49% owner, Albemarle Corporation is based in Charlotte, North Carolina, and is one of the world's largest lithium producers.

The majority owner, Tianqi Lithium Corporation, is based in Chengdu, China, and is listed on the Shanghai stock exchange. As of 2018, the company controls more than 46% of the world's global production of lithium. Tianqi Lithium Corporation is the second largest lithium company in the world by revenue and the largest in China.

The entity Windfield Holdings Pty Ltd (51% ownership) was established to purchase the mine and later 49% of its stock was sold. Windfield wholly owns Talison Lithium Pty Ltd, the entity that owns and operates the Greenbushes lithium mine.

Similarly, Albemarle owns their 49% stake in Windfield Pty Ltd through an entity known as RT Lithium. The mine was originally owned and built by Talison Lithium Pty Ltd that has been operating for over 128 years mining tin, tantalum, and lithium. The mine has been producing lithium concentrates for over 20 years, since 1983 when it became the world's first company to produce lithium concentrates from a hard-rock facility.

The lithium production industry is dominated by only four companies – Talison, SQM, Albemarle and FMC. Geographically, Australia, China and Chile also account for about 85% of global lithium production.

Recent events 

The joint venture partnership has come into turmoil recently due to Tianqi Corporation's well documented financial problems, exhibited in part by the fact that in March 2020, MSP Engineering Pty Ltd took Tianqi Lithium Kwinanathe entity that operates the Kwinana processing facility 
to the Supreme Court of Western Australia with a lawsuit claiming unpaid invoices of AUD$35.9 million. Part of Tianqi's problems emerged from their recent purchase of 20% of Chilean lithium producer SQM. The case is currently undergoing legal arbitration as of October 2020. SQM is also a Westfarmers partner in their new Kwinana processing facility. Westfarmers recently announced that they intend to continue with their plans for their facility despite the financial trouble of current producers.

Tianqi ultimate parent notes in their financial disclosures that they may be forced to offload part of its 49% stake in the mine or the Kwinana processing facility nearby, Albemarle was named as a potential bidder. While they have also delayed the expansion plans of their Kwinana plant.

Albemarle has recently announced that they have delayed the start of construction of their Kemerton plant until sometime in 2021 and have scaled back growth plans due to lithium growing pains. Although, demand for lithium-ion batteries has grown rapidly the lithium mining industries expansion has largely outpaced demand for lithium hydroxide. As such lithium mining has proved less profitable than mining for other minerals that are also inputs for batteries such as cobalt. Lithium is also relatively more abundant than other minerals that are seeing similar growth in demand.

The Kwinana facility was due to be completed by 2019 however, financial constraints of their parent Tianqi and the COVID-19 outbreak have seen it still awaiting the commencement of production as of the end of 2020.

References

External links
 
 MINEDEX website: Greenbushes Lithium Database of the Department of Mines, Industry Regulation and Safety

Lithium mines in Australia
Mines in Western Australia
Greenbushes, Western Australia